The Brooklyn Wanderers was a U.S. soccer team which was a founding member of the National Association Football League in the late nineteenth century.  Later versions joined the original American Soccer League and the reorganized American Soccer League.

Brooklyn Wanderers (1895–1899, 1912–1913)

History
In December 1894 the Wanderers were a key part of the formation of the National Association Football League.  The league suspended operations in 1899.  The team's competitive record then becomes difficult to follow as it appears to have operated as an independent club.  In September 1901, it lost to the Bayonne Rangers during a Labor Day sports carnival.  In 1906, a member of the Wanderers acted as a referee in a game between Critchleys and Brooklyn Thistle.  This rare reference to the Wanderers is significant in that Critchley's outside right Nat Agar (listed as Agot) later owned the Wanderers.  In 1912, the Wanderers rejoined the NAFBL, but withdrew only six games into the season.  Several of the players then jumped to Brooklyn F.C.

Year-by-year

Brooklyn Wanderers (1922–1931)

History
In 1922, the Bay Ridge F.C. fielded two clubs that fall. One continued under the Bay Ridge F.C. name in the First Division of the amateur New York State Association Football League and another was a reorganized Brooklyn Wanderers F.C. that was created to play in the newly-formed semi-pro New Jersey State Soccer League. The home pitch for both teams was Hawthorne Field.

The Wanderers played a handful of games in the New Jersey State League and three National Challenge Cup matches from mid-September through the first week of November in 1922. Then, on November 12 at a special meeting of the American Soccer League, the Wanderers were admitted (a month into the season) as the league's eighth club, belatedly replacing the Todd Shipyards F.C. that had left the league and disbanded during the off-season.

During its years in the ASL, the Wanderers played at Hawthorne Field, a dedicated soccer stadium owned by Agar. In 1926, Béla Guttmann briefly played for the team.   After the 1925/26 ASL season the Wanderers, the Boston Wonder Workers and the New Bedford Whalers joined with four top Canadian clubs to form the one-off International Soccer League held that summer and early fall. The Wanderers won the season championship, but lost to Toronto Ulster United in the final of the league's Nathan Strauss Cup.

The Wanderers folded after the 1931 Spring season, the first half of the ASL 1931 season.

Year-by-year

Brooklyn Wanderers (1932–1933)
The third Brooklyn Wanderers was also a member of the American Soccer League.

The club joined the league before the fall 1932 season and stayed through the disintegration of the league in the spring of 1933.

Year-by-year

Brooklyn Wanderers (1942–1949)
The fourth Brooklyn Wanderers was a member of the reformed American Soccer League.

Suffering financial trouble, the franchise was bought by the owners of Hakoah A.C. two games into the 1948/49 season. Hakoah left the National League to join the ASL and carried on from the Wanderers' loss and tie.

Year-by-year

References

 
Men's soccer clubs in New York (state)
Defunct soccer clubs in New York City
National Association Football League teams
American Soccer League (1921–1933) teams
American Soccer League (1933–1983) teams
Defunct sports teams in New York City
Sports in Brooklyn
Sports teams in New York City